Wellington is an unincorporated community in Menifee County, Kentucky, United States.  It lies along U.S. Route 460 and Kentucky Route 1693 southeast of the city of Frenchburg, the county seat of Menifee County.  Its elevation is 1,194 feet (364 m).  It has a post office with the ZIP code 40387.

Wellington is part of the Mount Sterling Micropolitan Statistical Area.

History

On March 2, 2012, a tornado struck Wellington and the nearby city of West Liberty.

References

Unincorporated communities in Menifee County, Kentucky
Unincorporated communities in Kentucky
Mount Sterling, Kentucky micropolitan area